The 1998 Asian Taekwondo Championships are the 13th edition of the Asian Taekwondo Championships, and were held in Ho Chi Minh City, Vietnam from May 15 to May 17, 1998.

Medal summary

Men

Women

Medal table

References
 Results

External links
WT Official Website

Asian Championships
Asian Taekwondo Championships
Asian Taekwondo Championships
Taekwondo Championships